The 2007 Forbes Canadian Mixed Curling Championship was held November 11–18, 2006 at the Westmount Golf and Country Club in Kitchener, Ontario. New Brunswick would win the event, only the province's second Mixed title. They were skipped by Terry Odishaw who defeated Quebec in the final. Quebec was skipped by the only female skip in the tournament, Ève Bélisle who also finished the round robin in first place.

Teams

Standings

Playoffs
Tie-breakers
 7-5 
 7-6 
Semi-final:  8-7 
Final:  6-4

External links
Event statistics

References

Canadian Mixed Curling Championship
Sport in Kitchener, Ontario
Curling in Ontario
2006 in Canadian curling
2006 in Ontario
November 2006 sports events in Canada